This list of the tallest buildings and structures in Jersey ranks buildings and structures in Jersey.

The Island's tallest structure is the  Fremont Point transmitting station. The tallest inhabitable structure is the  The Cedars. This list excludes the many churches scattered across the island except St Thomas Church.

Brief History
In 1883 work started on St Thomas Church in St Helier, upon its completion in 1887, standing at 197 ft (60m), it was the tallest structure in the Channel Islands, and it stayed that way until La Collette Chimney was constructed in 1966. Technically the only skyscraper on the island, it stands at 348ft (106m) and has been the tallest structure in Jersey ever since.

In 1963, the first high-rise building was constructed, with the La Collette High-Rise. Later in the 1970s many more high-rise buildings were built, especially in 1972 with De Quetteville Court, the Le Marais blocks and The Cedars being built. The Cedars was particularly important as it was and still is the tallest inhabitable building on the Island. Ever since then, many more high-rise buildings were built, but quite a few under , so are not on this list.

 there are 22 buildings in jersey over 30 meters tall with four more under construction or approved.

Tallest buildings and structures
An equal sign (=) following a rank indicates the same height between two or more buildings.

Tallest under construction, demolished, approved and proposed

References 

Skyscrapers